The economy of England is the largest economy of the four countries of the United Kingdom.

England is a highly industrialised country. It is an important producer of textiles and chemical products. Although automobiles, locomotives, and aircraft are among England's other important industrial products, a significant proportion of the country's income comes from the City of London. Since the 1990s, the financial services sector has played an increasingly significant role in the English economy and the City of London is one of the world's largest financial centres. Banks, insurance companies, commodity and futures exchanges are heavily concentrated in the City. The British pound sterling is the official currency of England and the central bank of the United Kingdom, the Bank of England, is located in London.

The service sector of the economy as a whole is now the largest in England, with manufacturing and primary industries in decline. The only major secondary industry that is growing is the construction industry, fueled by economic growth provided mainly by the growing services, administrative and financial sector.

GDP

Gross Domestic Product (GDP) figures are estimated (using a variety of means) for independent nations, and used to measure and compare aggregate (total) wealth between countries. Since England is not an independent state, but comprises one of the four major nations of the UK (along with Scotland, Wales, and Northern Ireland), there are fewer internationally-comparable figures available.

This would make the economy of England taken alone (£1.8tn / €2.0tn) approximately the world's 7th largest economy (just behind France and ahead of Italy) as opposed to the 5th largest for the UK as a whole (between Germany (4th), and India, 6th) by the usual criteria. Scotland's economy, for comparison, would be roughly the size of Greece's (50th).

History

In medieval times (c. 11th–15th century), the wool trade was the major industry of England and the country exported wool to Europe. Many market towns and ports grew up on the industry. Starting in 1555 with John Lok, England entered into the slave trade. John Hawkins is often considered to be the pioneer of the British slave trade, because he was the first to run the Triangular trade, making a profit at every stop. Poor infrastructure hampered the development of large scale industry. This changed when the canals and railways began to be built, in the late 18th century and early 19th century. England became the world's first industrialised nation, with the Industrial Revolution taking place in the late 18th century. This was also the age of British overseas expansion, where England relied upon colonies (such as India, America, Canada, or Australia) to bring in resources such as cotton and tobacco. English factories then processed goods and sold them on in both the quickly growing domestic market or abroad. Cities grew and large industrial centres were established, especially in the Midlands and North England.

Sectors

Agriculture and fishing

Agriculture is intensive, highly mechanised, and efficient by European standards, producing about 60% of food needs with only 2% of the labour force. It contributes around 2% of GDP. Around two thirds of production is devoted to livestock, and one third to arable crops. Agriculture is subsidised by the European Union's Common Agricultural Policy.

The main crops that are grown are wheat, barley, oats, potatoes, sugar beets.

The United Kingdom fishing industry contributed £446 million in 2019 in terms of Gross Value Added (GVA); this represents 0.02% of the UK's total GVA.  Scotland accounted for 61% of this output.  The largest English region was the South West, contributing 10% of overall output in the sector. Kingston upon Hull, Grimsby, Fleetwood, Great Yarmouth, and Lowestoft are among the coastal towns that have large fishing industries.

Finance

England's capital is London. The City of London is England's major financial district, and one of the world's leading financial centres. The city is where the London Stock Exchange, as well as many other exchanges, are based.

Service industries, particularly banking, insurance, and business services, account by far for the largest proportion of GDP and employ around 80% of the working population.

Leeds is England's second largest financial centre, with over 30 national and international banks based in the city. Over 124,000 people are employed in banking and financial services in Leeds, and over in the wider Leeds City Region.

Manchester is the largest financial and professional services sector outside London and is the mid tier private equity capital of Europe.

Manufacturing
Manufacturing continues to decline in importance. In the 1960s and 1970s manufacturing was a significant part of England's economic output. However, a lot of the heavy manufacturing industry was government-run and had failed to respond to world markets. State industries were sold off and over the 20th century many closed as they were unable to compete; a situation largely reflected in other Western industrialised countries. In June 2010, manufacturing in the United Kingdom accounted for 8.2% of the workforce and 12% of the country's national output. England remains a key player in the aerospace, defence, pharmaceutical and chemical industries, and British companies worldwide continue to have a role in the sector through foreign investment.

Tourism

Tourism accounted for £96 billion of GDP (8.6% of the economy) in 2009. It employs over 2 million people – around 4% of the working population.

The largest centre for tourism is London, which attracted close to 20 million tourists in 2016 alone. The British Museum (featuring over 8 million objects in its vast collection) has served as a major tourist attraction with over 5,906,716 visitors in 2017 alone.

Tourists are drawn to England due to a diverse range of reasons such as the existence of one of the world's few surviving monarchies. The historical importance of the British Empire as a world super power has also led to a rich history in areas such as architecture, tradition and art. Over time, the British Empire amassed an impressive collection of historically important artifacts, many of which are on display in the British Museum.

Effects of the COVID-19 pandemic 
The travel restrictions and lockdowns necessitated by the pandemic negatively affected the entire hospitality/tourism sector of the UK in 2020. (Most reports that provide statistics on this topic cover the entire UK as an entity, although some do include specifics for England.) An estimated 76% reduction in "inbound tourism" to the UK was experienced that year, according to VisitBritain. The forecast for 2021 (issued in January 2021) suggested that visits from other nations would be up "21% on 2020 but only 29% of the 2019 level". Some increase was expected during 2021, slowly at first; the tourism authority concluded that the number of visits was not expected to come "even close to normal levels".

The same VisitBritain report also discussed the effects of the pandemic on domestic travel within the UK in 2020, citing a significant reduction in spending, for an estimated  decline of 62% over the previous year. As of January 2021, the forecast for the year suggested that spending would increase by 79% over the previous year and that "the value of spending will be back to 84% of 2019 levels" by the end of 2021.

As of early April 2021, some of the restrictions on domestic travel were expected to be loosened during that month, at least for travel within England, Scotland and Wales. (No announcement had been made as of early April by Northern Ireland.) A BBC news item added that hotels and B&Bs might be allowed to "open for holidaymakers in England on 17 May at the earliest". An article in The Guardian stated that there was a likelihood that "all shops in England [would] be allowed to reopen" on 12 April 2021, while pubs and restaurants [would] be allowed to serve customers outdoors.

On 5 April 2021, the VisitBritain website discussed a plan to relax some restrictions on visits to the UK from other nations by mid-May. The feasibility of the plan became less certain as of 8 April 2021 when sources in the European Union stated on that a "third wave of the pandemic [was sweeping] the continent"; the B117 variant was of particular concern. Two days earlier, PM Boris Johnson had made it clear that "We don't want to see the virus being reimported into this country from abroad".

Regional variation

The strength of the English economy varies between regions. The following table shows the total GVA (gross value added) of each of the nine English region in addition to the GVA per capita. These figures are for 2016.

The British Chambers of Commerce Quarterly Economic Survey has information on how the economy of each region has performed since 1989.

See also
Economy of Northern Ireland
Economy of Scotland
Economy of Wales
Economy of the United Kingdom
Economy of Europe
List of country subdivisions by GDP over USD 100 billions

References

External links
CIA World Factbook
 British Chambers of Commerce Quarterly Economic Survey